Bozveli Peak is the peak rising to 1251 m in Trakiya Heights on Trinity Peninsula, Antarctic Peninsula.  Situated 3.78 km southeast of Antonov Peak, 2.7 km southwest of Mount Daimler, and 6.45 km north-northeast of Skakavitsa Peak in Kondofrey Heights.  Surmounting Victory Glacier to the southwest.

The peak is named after the Bulgarian enlightener Neofit Bozveli (1785-1848), a leader in the struggle for the restoration of the autocephalous Bulgarian Church.

Location
German-British mapping in 1996.

Maps
 Trinity Peninsula. Scale 1:250000 topographic map No. 5697. Institut für Angewandte Geodäsie and British Antarctic Survey, 1996.
 Antarctic Digital Database (ADD). Scale 1:250000 topographic map of Antarctica. Scientific Committee on Antarctic Research (SCAR), 1993–2016.

Notes

References
 Bulgarian Antarctic Gazetteer. Antarctic Place-names Commission. (details in Bulgarian, basic data in English)
 Bozveli Peak. SCAR Composite Antarctic Gazetteer

External links
 Bozveli Peak. Copernix satellite image

Mountains of Trinity Peninsula
Bulgaria and the Antarctic